Mawogola County is a county in the Central Region of Uganda.

Location
Mawogola County is west and south of Lwemiyaga County, and together they form Sembabule District. Among the sub-counties that constitute Mawogola County are (a) Lwebitakuli sub-county (b) Lugusulu sub-county (c) Mateete sub-county (d) Mijwala sub-county and (e) Sembabule Town Council.

Overview
Mawogola County lies in the dry cattle corridor of Uganda. The major economic activity is farming of both crops and animals.

See also
 Lwemiyaga County

References

Counties of Uganda
Sembabule District
Central Region, Uganda